Fred W. Crum (December 3, 1912 – July 11, 1987) was an American professional basketball player. Churchfield played in the National Basketball League for the Pittsburgh Raiders in 1944–45 and averaged 5.8 points per game. Crum was an alternate for the 1936 United States men's Olympic basketball team.

References

1912 births
1987 deaths
American men's basketball players
Basketball players from Pittsburgh
Forwards (basketball)
Guards (basketball)
Pittsburgh Raiders players